The Cleveland Railway Company was the public transit operator in Cleveland, Ohio, from 1910 to 1942. The company began operations with assets of the former Forest City Railway, which operated from 1906 to 1909. The company owned a fleet of PCC streetcars.

Though National City Lines never owned the system in Cleveland, General Motors did negotiate the sale of buses to the city, resulting in the shutdown of the streetcar system.  In Cleveland, complaints were made to the FBI after the mayor and city councilors were seen driving around in new General Motors cars.  Mayor Ray T. Miller did receive a new car within a month of General Motors' winning the contract for new buses.  The FBI refused to investigate based on high-profile nature of the people targeted.

The city of Cleveland bought out Cleveland Railway in 1942 and used it as the nucleus for the Cleveland Transit System, the precursor to the current Greater Cleveland Regional Transit Authority.

The Cleveland streetcars were sold to the Toronto Transit Commission, where they remained in service for thirty years until 1982.  Others were sold to the Berlin and Waterloo Street Railway Company.

Fleet
Peter Witt streetcar - 130 ordered in 1915 and 1916
 Peter Witt streetcar - ordered 1918 and 5 cars sold to London Street Railway in 1923 and re-sold to various operators in 1941
 Presidents' Conference Committee cars - 75 all-electric cars sold in 1952 to Toronto Transportation Commission: 50 Pullman Standard A11 and 25 St. Louis Car Company A12 (originally ordered by Louisville Railway)

See also
National City Lines - A company owned by gas and car companies (including General Motors that targeted streetcar systems for shutdown.
Great American streetcar conspiracy
Northern Ohio Railway Museum

References

External links
History Detectives - PBS Television show, has an episode about the Cleveland streetcar system.
Encyclopedia of Cleveland History entry

Defunct Ohio railroads
Defunct public transport operators in the United States
History of Cleveland
Light rail in Ohio
Tram, urban railway and trolley companies
Transportation in Cleveland
Railway companies established in 1910
American companies established in 1910
Railway companies disestablished in 1942